The 1979 Nobel Prize in Literature was awarded to the Greek poet Odysseas Elytis (1911–1996) "for his poetry, which, against the background of Greek tradition, depicts with sensuous strength and intellectual clear-sightedness modern man's struggle for freedom and creativeness." He is the second Greek recipient of the literature prize after another poet Giorgos Seferis in 1963.

Laureate

Influences of surrealism meet traditional Greek literature in the poetry of Odysseas Eytis. Most of his poems celebrates light, the sun, his native country's historic ruins, the blue sea, and the rocky terrain of Greece. Elytis' experiences during World War II introduced a darker element and tone into his poetic world. One of his most prominent works is Άξιον Εστί ("It Is Worthy", 1959), in which poetry and prose intermingle as in old Byzantine liturgy. His other significant oeuvres include Έξη και μια τύψεις για τον ουρανό ("Six Plus One Remorses For The Sky", 1960), Ο ήλιος ο ηλιάτορας ("The Sovereign Sun", 1971), Τα Ρω του Έρωτα ("The Trills of Love", 1973).

References

External links
 1979 Press release nobelprize.org

1979